Scotcampus is an independent student magazine in Scotland. The paper is put together using a combination of freelance journalists and student writers from across Scotland. It is distributed throughout various locations in all of Scotland's major towns and cities.

Background
Scotcampus was founded by Graeme Barratt and Anna Purdie, who launched it in 2001. The magazine operates as a lifestyle publication, using approachable and inspiring journalism to reach student readers across all campuses in Scotland. In October 2012 Jennifer Lynn was named as the editor of Scotcampus. The magazine is published on a bimonthly basis.

Since it was founded Scotcampus has interviewed a number of different high-profile musicians, politicians, actors, directors and people of interest. Some of the most notable have included: The Prodigy, Dizzee Rascal,  Alex Salmond, Michelle Mone, Alastair Campbell, Armando Iannucci, Howard Marks, and Sir Tom Hunter.

Freshers' Festival

Since 2007, Scotcampus has hosted a Student Freshers' Festival, taking place in Glasgow annually. The Freshers' Festival attracts more than 10,000 students and young people from across Scotland by offering up a selection of bands, DJ's and free gifts. Previous exhibitors at the Festival have been wide-ranging and have included Urban Outfitters, Royal Air Force, Domino's Pizza, Ernst & Young and YO! Sushi. In 2010 the Freshers' Festivals expanded into Edinburgh. Both events were powered with renewable energy.

References

External links
 
 http://www.freshersfestival.com

Bi-monthly magazines published in the United Kingdom
Independent magazines
Free magazines
Magazines established in 2001
Magazines published in Scotland
Mass media in Glasgow
Student magazines published in the United Kingdom